Pareugyrioides is a genus of marine tunicates.

Species
 Pareugyrioides arnbackae (Millar, 1960)
 Pareugyrioides chardyi Monniot C. & Monniot F., 1977
 Pareugyrioides dalli (Ritter, 1913)
 Pareugyrioides digitus Monniot, 1997
 Pareugyrioides exigua (Kott, 1972)
 Pareugyrioides flagrifera (Sluiter, 1904)
 Pareugyrioides galatheae (Millar, 1959)
 Pareugyrioides longipedata (Sluiter, 1904)
 Pareugyrioides macquariensis Kott, 1954
 Pareugyrioides macrentera (Millar, 1962)
 Pareugyrioides vannamei (Monniot, 1970)

Species names currently considered to be synonyms:
 Pareugyrioides bostrychobranchus Redikorzev, 1941: synonym of Pareugyrioides dalli (Ritter, 1913) 
 Pareugyrioides filholi (Pizon, 1898): synonym of Paramolgula filholi (Pizon, 1898) 
 Pareugyrioides flagifera (Sluiter, 1904): synonym of Pareugyrioides flagrifera (Sluiter, 1904) 
 Pareugyrioides galathea : synonym of Pareugyrioides galatheae (Millar, 1959) 
 Pareugyrioides japonica Hartmeyer, 1914: synonym of Eugyra glutinans (Moeller, 1842)

References

Stolidobranchia
Tunicate genera